Stanley High School  may refer to:
 Stanley High School (Southport), a school in Merseyside, England
Stanley High School (New Brunswick), a school in Stanley, New Brunswick, Canada

See also
Stanley Girls High School, a school in Hyderabad, Andhra Pradesh, India 
Stanley Park High School, a school in Carshalton, Surrey, England
Stanley Technical High School, former name of Harris Academy South Norwood, a school in London, England